Jenn Cuneta is a Filipino American singer, actress, and model, based in New York. Debuting first as J. CEE in 1993, she changed to Jenn Cuneta in 2005. Her 2005 solo single "Come Rain Come Shine", which samples "Silly Love Songs" by Paul McCartney and Wings, reached No. 2 on the Billboard Dance Airplay chart and was featured on Ultra.Weekend and Dance Dance Revolution Hottest Party 2. She is a niece of Sharon Cuneta.

Discography

Albums 

 2001: Dreaming of Love (Star Records)

Singles 

 1993: "Hold on Me" (Warlock Records)
 1994: "Do It for Me" (Rufftrack Records)
 1995: "What You Do" (Strictly Rhythm)
 1996: Featured in "Music Is My Life" by Planet Soul (Strictly Rhythm)
 2000: "Spirit of a Man" (Jellybean Recordings)
 2001: Featured in "Now We Are Free", theme from the film Gladiator, by Andy & the Lamboy (Tommy Boy Silver Label)
 2001: "Potion" (Groovilicious)
 2001: "Freedom" (Jellybean Recordings)
 2005: "Come Rain Come Shine" (Ultra Music)/Positiva UK
 2006: "Let Me Take You Away" (Ultra Music)
 2007: "I Want That Man" (Bill Friar Entertainment)
 2007: "Sexy to the Bone" – Andy & the Lamboy
 2009: "Nothing Compares 2 You" (Bill Friar Entertainment)
 2009: "Where Did You Go" – Andy & the Lamboy
 2011: "Fifth Day" (Bill Friar Entertainment)
 2012: "O Holy Night" (Bill Friar Entertainment)
 2014: "Tonight's Your Night" (7 Stars Music)
 2017: "The Glamorous Life" (Bill Friar Entertainment)
 2017: "Quiero Tu Amor" (Sume Music)
 2018: "Eternal Love" (Fine-Tune Records)

Awards and nominations 

 2006: Nomination for Record of the Year – "Come Rain Come Shine" (Grammy Awards by the National Academy of Recording Arts and Sciences)
 2006: Nomination for Best New Artist (Grammy Awards by the National Academy of Recording Arts and Sciences)
 2006: Nomination for Best Dance Recording – "Come Rain Come Shine" (Grammy Awards by the National Academy of Recording Arts and Sciences)
 2006: Dance Artist of the Year (XM Nation Radio Award – XM Satellite Radio/Sirius)
 2018: Best Female Pop Vocalist of the World ( WCOPA)

References

Living people
American women pop singers
American dance musicians
American house musicians
American musicians of Filipino descent
Filipino women pop singers
Filipino dance musicians
Singers from Manila
Year of birth missing (living people)
21st-century American women